Young Israel of Ottawa is a traditional Orthodox Synagogue located in Westboro. It is a warm and close-knit congregation that provides a full array of religious services, adult classes and family programming open to all Jews in Ottawa.

History
The Jewish population of Ottawa grew from 20 families in 1889 to approximately 5,500 in 1961. The Young Israel of Ottawa congregation began in 1967 as an orthodox minyan which met in the basement of Rose and Moe Litwack's home on Kirkwood. In 1968, a store on Merivale Road, which is now demolished, was dedicated on March 31, 1968. In 1968, a Sefer Torah was donated by the late Gilbert Greenberg. In 1980, a property consisting of a basement and first floor was purchased at 627 Kirkwood Avenue. The upper floor was constructed in the late summer of 1980. The synagogue was dedicated On August 17, 1980. Rabbi Howard G. Messinger was the first spiritual leader followed by part-time rabbis who were also teachers at Hillel Academy such as Rabbi Millen, principal of Hillel Academy, Rabbi Pritzker, teacher, Rabbi Wolkenstein and Rabbi Ben Natan. Rabbi Mordecai Y. Berger arrived as spiritual leader in 1976.

Programming
The Young Israel of Ottawa programming includes: Shabbat, Yom Tov and Daily services, and youth activities.

Jewish Memorial Gardens
As of 1 July 2008, each of the Founding Members: Congregation Machzikei Hadas; Congregation Beth Shalom; Agudath Israel (Ottawa); the Jewish Reform Congregation Temple Israel (Ottawa); Young Israel of Ottawa; Congregation Beit Tikvah of Ottawa transferred to Jewish Memorial Gardens the cemetery lands that they had.

References

Jews and Judaism in Ottawa
Synagogues in Ottawa
Buildings and structures in Ottawa
Orthodox synagogues in Canada
1967 establishments in Ontario
Jewish organizations established in 1967
National Council of Young Israel